Ten Mile River or Tenmile River may refer to:

Rivers
 Ten Mile River (California), in northern California
 Ten Mile River (Housatonic River), in New York and western Connecticut
 Tenmile River (Maine), a tributary of the Saco River
 Ten Mile River (Seekonk River), in central Massachusetts and Rhode Island
 Tenmile Wash, in Arizona

Other
 Ten Mile River Boy Scout Camp, overlooking the Delaware River in New York State
 Tenmile River (Metro-North station), in Amenia, New York

See also
 Tenmile Creek (disambiguation)
 Ten Mile Run (disambiguation)